Second to None is an album by the Japanese R&B duo Chemistry, released on January 8, 2003 by Sony Music Japan.

Track listing
 "Intro-lude~You're My Second to None~"
 "It Takes Two"
 "STILL ECHO"
 "My Gift to You"
 "Running Away"
 "BACK TOGETHER AGAIN Interlude~@Electric Lady Studio, NYC~"
 "No Color Line"
 "FLOATIN'"
 "SOLID DREAM"
 "Let's Get Together Now (Tokyo Calling) Interlude~@Yuigahama, KAMAKURA~"
 "RIPTIDE"
 "月夜"
 "マイウェイ"
 "君をさがしてた～New Jersey United~(BONUS TRACK)"

External links
 Official Site: Track downloads

Chemistry (band) albums
2003 albums